Hükümet Kadın 2 (Government Woman 2) is a 2013 Turkish comedy film, directed and written by Sermiyan Midyat. It is a prequel to the 2013 film Hükümet Kadın and its story takes place seven years before that of the original film.

References

External links 
 

2013 films
2013 comedy films
Turkish comedy films
2010s Turkish-language films
Turkish sequel films